James A. McGuire (February 4, 1875 – January 26, 1917) was a Major League Baseball shortstop who played for one season. He played for the Cleveland Blues for 18 games during the 1901 Cleveland Bluebirds season.

External links

1875 births
1917 deaths
Major League Baseball shortstops
Cleveland Blues (1901) players
Baseball players from New York (state)
Amsterdam Red Stockings players
Scranton Miners players
Scranton Red Sox players
Syracuse Stars (minor league baseball) players
Johnstown Mormans players
Palmyra Mormans players
Rome Romans players
People from Dunkirk, New York